Trox capillaris is a beetle of the family Trogidae.

References 

capillaris
Beetles described in 1823